Theba is a taxonomic genus of air-breathing land snails, medium-sized pulmonate gastropod mollusks in the family Helicidae, the true snails. 

Theba is the type genus of the tribe Thebini.

The genus occurs in the Mediterranean Basin, in the Canary Islands, and in Morocco.

Species
Species within the genus Theba include:
 Theba andalusica Gittenberger & Ripken, 1987
 Theba arinagae Gittenberger & Ripken, 1987
 † Theba cartaxensis (Roman, 1907) 
 Theba chudeaui (Germain, 1908)
 Theba clausoinflata (Mousson, 1857)
 † Theba costillae Hutterer, 1990 
 Theba geminata (Mousson, 1857)
 Theba grasseti (Mousson, 1872)
 Theba impugnata (Mousson, 1857)
 Theba lindneri Kittel, 2012
 Theba macandrewiana (L. Pfeiffer, 1853)
 † Theba milneedwardsi (Filhol, 1877)
 Theba orzolae Gittenberger & Ripken, 1985
 Theba pisana (Müller, 1774) – type species
 † Theba quintanellensis (Roman, 1907) 
 Theba sacchii (Gitten & Ripken, 1987)
 Theba solimae (Sacchi, 1955)
 Theba subdentata (Férussac, 1821)
 Theba tantanensis Hutterer, Greve & Haase, 2010

Species brought into synonymy
 Theba albocincta P. Hesse, 1912: synonym of Monacha albocincta (Hesse, 1912) (original combination)
 Theba cemenelea Risso, 1826: synonym of Monacha cemenelea (Risso, 1826) (original combination)
 Theba compingtae' Pallary, 1929: synonym of Monacha compingtae (Pallary, 1929) (original combination)
 Theba dofleini P. Hesse, 1928: synonym of Monacha dofleini (P. Hesse, 1928) (original combination)
 Theba hemitricha P. Hesse, 1914: synonym of Paratheba hemitricha (P. Hesse, 1914): synonym of Monacha hemitricha (P. Hesse, 1914) (original combination)
 Theba melitenensis P. Hesse, 1915: synonym of Monacha melitenensis (P. Hesse, 1915) (original combination)
 Theba orientalis Hesse, 1914: synonym of Monacha (Metatheba) samsunensis (L. Pfeiffer, 1868) represented as Monacha samsunensis (L. Pfeiffer, 1868) (junior synonym)
 Theba pontica (P. Fischer in Tchihatcheff, 1866) †: synonym of Monacha pontica (P. Fischer in Tchihatcheff, 1866) †
 Theba rubella Risso, 1826: synonym of Monacha cemenelea (Risso, 1826) (junior synonym)
 Theba samsunensis (L. Pfeiffer, 1868): synonym of Monacha samsunensis'' (L. Pfeiffer, 1868) (unaccepted combination)

References

 Bank, R. A. (2017). Classification of the Recent terrestrial Gastropoda of the World. Last update: July 16th, 2017

External links
 Risso A. (1826). Histoire naturelle des principales productions de l'Europe méridionale et particulièrement de celles des environs de Nice et des Alpes Maritimes, vol. 4. Paris: Levrault. vii + 439 pp., pls 1-12
 Hartmann, J.D.W. (1840-1844). Erd- und Süsswasser-Gasteropoden der Schweiz. Mit Zugabe einiger merkwürdigen exotischen Arten, i-xx
 Held, F. (1837-1838). Notizen über die Weichthiere Bayerns. Isis (Oken), 30 (4): 303-309 (1837); 30 (12): 901-919 (1838). Leipzig
 Beck, H. (1837). Index molluscorum praesentis aevi musei principis augustissimi Christiani Frederici. 1-124. Hafniae 

Helicidae
Gastropod genera
Taxonomy articles created by Polbot
Taxa named by Antoine Risso